Yakubu Mohammed (alias: Yakubu Usman Shehu Abubakar El-Nafati) (born 25 March 1973) is a Nigerian film actor, producer, director, singer and script writer. He is a Globacom ambassador, SDGs ambassador and at a time, an ambassador for Nescafe Beverage. Yakubu Mohammed is a seasoned actor of repute and a household name in both Kannywood and Nollywood. He has sung over 1000 songs, featured in well over 100 Hausa films and more than 40 English films some of which includes; Lionheart, 4th Republic, Sons of the Caliphate and MTV Shuga which earned him several nominations and awards such as City People Entertainment Awards and Nigeria Entertainment Awards.

Career
Yakubu Mohammed started off in Kannywood as at 1998 writing scripts and working behind the scene. Along the line, he got trained on the job whilst rising through the ranks and files and in no time found himself calling the shots. Yakubu as a music artist  has recorded over 1000 songs for film music and albums in Hausa and English.
After working from the background for so long he got his first movie gig in Gabar Cikin Gida in 2013  where he got featured alongside his friend and partner Sani Musa Danja. He made a cross over to Nollywood in 2016 with a debut in Sons of the Caliphate together with his colleague Rahama Sadau and also got featured in MTV's Shuga and Lionheart.

Nollywood Movies

Kannywood Movies

References

1973 births
Nigerian male film actors
University of Jos alumni
Hausa-language mass media
Living people
Male actors in Hausa cinema
21st-century Nigerian male actors
Hausa people
Nigerian screenwriters
Kannywood actors
Nigerian film directors
Nigerian film producers
Nigerian male singers
Nigerian television actors
Nigerian media personalities